Ingham railway station was a railway station in Ingham, Suffolk which was located was on the route between Thetford and Bury St Edmunds.

History
The railway line between Bury St Edmunds and Thetford was proposed by the Bury St Edmunds and Thetford Railway (B&TR) and authorised on 5 July 1865; but the company had problems in raising the necessary money. The B&TR was purchased by the Great Eastern Railway (GER) in 1878.

Trains on the B&TR were operated by the T&WR until 1879, when operation was taken over by the GER; after this, trains from Bury began to run to Thetford; the east to south curve at Thetford Bridge was not used after 1880. Thetford Bridge was then the last station before .

The station was closed to passenger traffic on 8 June 1953 although goods traffic lingered on for a few years before withdrawal on 24 June 1960. The station had a single platform with a ticket office and a small goods yard.

References

External links
 Ingham station on navigable 1946 O. S. map

Disused railway stations in Suffolk
Former Great Eastern Railway stations
Railway stations in Great Britain opened in 1876
Railway stations in Great Britain closed in 1953
Borough of St Edmundsbury